Roniery Ximenis Sousa Silva (born November 23, 1987 in São Luís), known as Roniery, is a Brazilian footballer who plays as right back for Villa Nova.

Career
Roniery played for Botafogo Futebol Clube (SP) in the 2015 Campeonato Paulista but was sidelined by injuries and competition from regular right back Gimenez.

Career statistics

References

External links

1987 births
Living people
Brazilian footballers
Association football defenders
Campeonato Brasileiro Série A players
Campeonato Brasileiro Série B players
Campeonato Brasileiro Série D players
Mogi Mirim Esporte Clube players
Paraná Clube players
Esporte Clube Bahia players
Botafogo Futebol Clube (SP) players
Ceará Sporting Club players
Paysandu Sport Club players
Sampaio Corrêa Futebol Clube players
Botafogo Futebol Clube (PB) players
Villa Nova Atlético Clube players